Brent Kallman (born October 4, 1990) is an American professional soccer player who plays for Major League Soccer club Minnesota United FC. His siblings Brian and Kassey are also professional soccer players. Brian formerly played for Minnesota United when the team competed in the North American Soccer League.

Career
Kallman graduated from Woodbury High School in Woodbury, Minnesota. He was a multi-sport athlete, earning four letters in soccer, three in tennis, two in basketball and one in football.

College
Kallman attended Creighton University and played four seasons from 2009–2012, helping the program make back to back college cup appearances in 2011–12.

Professional
He signed his first professional contract with Minnesota United FC in May 2013. He played for Minnesota United, splitting time between the reserves and full team until the 2016 season when he became a mainstay of the back line. In January 2017, Kallman was signed to United as they transitioned to MLS.

On August 15, 2020, Kallman moved on loan to USL Championship side El Paso Locomotive.

Personal life
In addition to professional soccer, Kallman is an accomplished poker player, having earned $193,192 in tournament poker. His best live cash is $62,110 on November 23, 2018 at the $3,500 WPT Seminole Rock N Roll Poker Open Main Event.

References

External links
 Creighton Bluejays bio

1990 births
Living people
American soccer players
Association football defenders
Creighton Bluejays men's soccer players
Des Moines Menace players
Major League Soccer players
Minnesota United FC (2010–2016) players
Minnesota United FC players
El Paso Locomotive FC players
North American Soccer League players
Soccer players from Nebraska
Sportspeople from Omaha, Nebraska
USL League Two players
American poker players